Crown Prosecutor is a British television legal drama series, created and principally written by Nick Collins, first broadcast on BBC1 on 23 February 1995. A single series of ten episodes were broadcast, typically at 8:30pm on Thursdays, with episodes repeatedly on Fridays at 1:50pm as part of the channel's daytime schedule. The series was produced in-house by the BBC under the BBC Worldwide moniker. The series follows ensemble cast of various Crown Prosecutors, who bring cases before local magistrates in the United Kingdom. The series stars Tom Chadbon, David Daker, Deborah Grant, Jessica Stevenson, Paris Jefferson, Shaun Parkes and Michael Praed.

The series was noted at the time as being the first series to regularly examine the lives of modern British Crown prosecutors. While lawyers "for the prosecution" had been seen on British television, these were depictions of a different era in British jurisprudence. Throughout the bulk of 20th century, in most parts of England and Wales, prosecution of criminal cases was handled by the police or, in some cases, an entity directly attached to the Home Office. Crown Prosecutor was thus the first serious examination of what it was like to work in the Crown Prosecution Service, a completely police-independent body, which itself had only been established in 1985.

The series has not been repeated since its original broadcast, however a single episode is available to watch on YouTube.

Structure
Each episode generally featured a primary plot centred on an unfolding court case, along with two subplots that advanced the development of the show's cast of characters.

Sometimes the subplots involved other, typically less serious, court cases—such as the vandalism charges brought against people who ate a chocolate sculpture in episode seven. But these subplots often were entirely outside the courtroom and served to reveal different facets of the prosecutor's lives.  Sticky living arrangements, new romance, old flames, and professional temptation were all featured in the series.  Though these plots allowed viewers a glimpse into the prosecutors' lives to a much greater degree than would be possible on the somewhat comparable Law & Order, the character development never expanded to the level of a soap opera.

This was in part because Crown Prosecutor had a notably unusual run-time, compared with other legal dramas of its era.  Episodes were 30 minutes long, shorter by 12 to 15 minutes than many courtroom dramas which ran on commercial television in 1995.  Despite this shorter format, a resolution to all of the primary plots, and most of the secondary ones were given by the end of each episode.

Cast
 Tom Chadbon as Lenny Monk
 David Daker as Ben Campbell
 Deborah Grant as Sheila Cody
 Jessica Stevenson as Jackie South
 Paris Jefferson as Nina Fisher-Holmes
 Shaun Parkes as Eric Jackson
 Michael Praed as Marty James

Episodes

References

External links
 

1990s British television miniseries
BBC television dramas
1995 British television series debuts
1995 British television series endings
1990s British drama television series
1990s British legal television series
English-language television shows
Television series about prosecutors